These are the bishops consecrated in the Reformed Episcopal Church from its founding in 1873 to the present, along with the bishops consecrated in the Free Church of England from REC episcopal succession.

See also 
 List of bishops of the Anglican Church in North America

References 

Historical resources on the Reformed Episcopal Church from Project Canterbury

Reformed Episcopal Church
Bishops of the Reformed Episcopal Church